Luciana Serra (born 4 November 1946, in Genoa) is an Italian coloratura soprano.

Career
Serra made her international debut in 1966 as Eleonora in Cimarosa's  at the Hungarian State Opera House in Budapest, but did not achieve general acclaim until the late 1970s, when she took on coloratura roles in Donizetti's Lucia di Lammermoor and Bellini's La sonnambula. In 1988, Serra debuted at the Vienna State Opera singing the Queen of the Night in a new production of Die Zauberflöte conducted by Nikolaus Harnoncourt and staged by Otto Schenk.

Her fame reached a peak during the break of the 1980s and 1990s, when she performed the Queen of the Night in Die Zauberflöte at the Royal Opera House in London and at the Metropolitan Opera in New York.

She regularly teaches at Villa Medici in Rome and at the Accademia La Scala in Milan.

Her discography includes Il barbiere di Siviglia, Il viaggio a Reims, Rigoletto, Don Pasquale and Die Zauberflöte.

References

External links
 Website
 Masterclass with Luciana Serra at Villa Medici Giulini, Briosco (MB) Italy

Italian operatic sopranos
Italian music educators
1946 births
Living people
Musicians from Genoa
20th-century Italian women opera singers
21st-century Italian women opera singers
Women music educators